The Order of Wen-Hu (English – The Order of the Striped Tiger) was an award for military or naval service awarded by the Republic of China. It was issued in five classes. The badge showed a striped tiger in natural colours on a central medallion. During World War I, a large number of Chinese served with both the Chinese Labour Corps and the Royal Army Medical Corps, and many British officers, particularly in those two corps, received the order. The majority were issued in February 1920.

Notable recipients
British Major R. V. C. Bodley
British Admiral of the Fleet Sir Osmond de Beauvoir Brock
U.S. Navy Officer Walter S. Crosley
British Colonel Bryan Fairfax
Lieutenant General Sir Humfrey Myddelton Gale
Japanese General Tanaka Giichi
U.S. Admiral Albert Gleaves
British Brigadier General Frederick Kisch
British Field Marshal Frederick Rudolph Lambart, 10th Earl of Cavan
British Admiral of the Fleet Sir Charles Madden, 1st Baronet
British Missionary William Edward Soothill
British Admiral of the Fleet Sir Frederick Charles Doveton Sturdee, 1st Baronet
British Vice Admiral Norman Wodehouse
Marshal Zhang Zuolin, Tuchun of Manchuria

References

Military awards and decorations of China
Orders, decorations, and medals of the Republic of China